The Silver Star Medal (SSM) is the United States Armed Forces' third-highest military decoration for valor in combat. The Silver Star Medal is awarded primarily to members of the United States Armed Forces for gallantry in action against an enemy of the United States.

History
The Silver Star Medal (SSM) is the successor award to the "Citation Star" ( silver star) which was established by an Act of Congress on July 9, 1918, during World War I. On July 19, 1932, the Secretary of War approved the conversion of the "Citation Star" to the SSM with the original "Citation Star" incorporated into the center of the medal.

Authorization for the Silver Star Medal was placed into law by an Act of Congress for the U.S. Navy on August 7, 1942, and an Act of Congress for the U.S. Army on December 15, 1942.

The U.S. Army awards the medal as the "Silver Star". The U.S. Navy, Marine Corps, Air Force, Space Force, and Coast Guard award the medal as the "Silver Star Medal". Since 21 December 2016, the Department of Defense (DoD) refers to the decoration as the "Silver Star Medal".

Award criteria
The Silver Star Medal is awarded for gallantry, so long as the action does not justify the award of one of the next higher valor awards: the Distinguished Service Cross, the Navy Cross, the Air Force Cross, or the Coast Guard Cross. The gallantry displayed must have taken place while in action against an enemy of the United States, while engaged in military operations involving conflict with an opposing foreign force, or while serving with friendly foreign forces engaged in an armed conflict against an opposing armed force in which the United States is not a belligerent party.

The Silver Star Medal is awarded for singular acts of valor or heroism over a brief period, such as one or two days of a battle.

Air Force pilots and combat systems officers and Navy/Marine Corps naval aviators and flight officers flying fighter aircraft, are often considered eligible to receive the Silver Star upon becoming an ace (i.e., having five or more confirmed aerial kills), which entails the pilot and, in multi-seat fighters, the weapons system officer or radar intercept officer, intentionally and successfully risking his life multiple times under combat conditions and emerging victorious. However, during the Vietnam War, the last conflict to produce U.S. fighter aces: an Air Force pilot and two navigators/weapon systems officers (who were later retrained as Air Force pilots), a naval aviator and a naval flight officer/radar intercept officer who had achieved this distinction, were eventually awarded the Air Force Cross and Navy Cross, respectively, in addition to SSMs previously awarded for earlier aerial kills.

Unit award equivalent
 Air Force – Gallant Unit Citation
 Army – Valorous Unit Award
 Coast Guard – Coast Guard Unit Commendation
 Navy-Marine Corps – Navy Unit Commendation

Appearance
The Silver Star Medal is a gold five-pointed star,  in circumscribing diameter with a laurel wreath encircling rays from the center and a  diameter silver star superimposed in the center. The pendant is suspended from a rectangular shaped metal loop with rounded corners. The reverse has the inscription FOR GALLANTRY IN ACTION.

Ribbon devices
Second and subsequent awards of the Silver Star Medal are denoted by bronze or silver oak leaf clusters in the Army and Air Force and by gold or silver  inch stars in the Navy, Marine Corps, and Coast Guard.

Recipients

The Department of Defense does not keep extensive records for the Silver Star Medal. Independent groups estimate that between 100,000 and 150,000 SSMs have been awarded since the decoration was established. Colonel David Hackworth who was awarded ten SSMs while serving in the Army during the Korean War and Vietnam War, is likely to be the person awarded the most SSMs. General of the Army Douglas MacArthur was awarded seven SSMs for his service in France in World War I from February to November 1918 as a colonel and then brigadier general. Donald H. Russell, a civilian Vought F4U Corsair technical support engineer attached to a Marine Corps fighter wing, received the SSM for his actions aboard  after the carrier was attacked by a Japanese dive bomber in March 1945. In the fall of 1944, President Roosevelt's close adviser Harry Hopkins, the U.S. Ambassador in Moscow W. Averell Harriman and a military attaché presented the SSM to Soviet Red Army artillery officer Alexei Voloshin, who was the first to cross the Dnieper with his battery and was one of four junior Red Army officers who received the award.

Female recipients
Three Army nurses that served in World War I were cited in 1919 and 1920 with Citation Stars for gallantry in attending to the wounded while under artillery fire in July 1918. In 2007, it was discovered that they had never been awarded their Citation Stars. The three nurses (Army nurses served without rank until 1920) were awarded the Silver Star Medal posthumously:
 Jane Rignel – Mobile Hospital No. 2, 42nd Division, for gallantry in "giving aid to the wounded under heavy fire" in France on July 15, 1918
 Linnie Leckrone – Shock Team No. 134, Field Hospital No. 127, 32nd Division, for gallantry while "attending to the wounded during an artillery bombardment" in France on July 29, 1918
 Irene Robar – Shock Team No. 134, Field Hospital No. 127, 32nd Division, for gallantry while "attending to the wounded during an artillery bombardment" in France on July 29, 1918

An unknown number of servicewomen received the award in World War II. Four Army nurses serving in Italy during the war—First Lieutenant Mary Roberts, Second Lieutenant Elaine Roe, Second Lieutenant Rita Virginia Rourke, and Second Lieutenant Ellen Ainsworth (posthumous)—became the first women recipients of the Silver Star, all cited for their bravery in evacuating the 33rd Field Hospital at Anzio on February 10, 1944.

The next known servicewomen to receive the Silver Star were Army National Guard Sergeant Leigh Ann Hester in 2005, for gallantry during an insurgent ambush on a convoy in Iraq and Army Specialist Monica Lin Brown in March 2008, for extraordinary heroism as a combat medic in the War in Afghanistan.

Notable recipients 

John Adair
Joseph H. Albers
John R. Alison
Darr H. Alkire
Leslie "Bull" Allen
Royal B. Allison
Terry de la Mesa Allen Sr.
Samuel E. Anderson
Bernard L. Austin
Lloyd Austin
William Brantley Aycock
Peter Badcoe (two awards)
John Bahnsen (five awards) 
Vernon Baker
Robert H. Barrow
Olinto Barsanti
César Basa
Harry F. Bauer
Charles Alvin Beckwith
David Bellavia (Upgraded to the Medal of Honor in 2019)

Rafael Celestino Benítez
Everett Ernest Blakely
Albert Blithe
Larry "Scrappy" Blumer
Royal L. Bolling
Richard Bong
Paul Boesch
Bruce Godfrey Brackett
Omar Bradley
Neville Brand
Maurice L. Britt
Monica Lin Brown
Hubert Buchanan
Phil H. Bucklew
Arleigh Burke
Jess Cain

Modesto Cartagena
Alwyn Cashe (Upgraded to the Medal of Honor in 2021)
Johnny Checketts
Llewellyn Chilson (three awards)
David Christian (two awards)
Nestor Chylak
Wesley Clark
Max Cleland

Lynn Compton
Garlin Murl Conner (four awards)
John Thomas Corley (eight awards)
Alan "Ace" Cozzalio (two awards)
Louis Cukela
William J. Cullerton 
Roy M. Davenport
Juan César Cordero Dávila
Benjamin O. Davis Jr.
Ray Davis
Oliver W. Dillard
James H. Doolittle
Wayne A. Downing (two awards)
Hugh A. Drum

 Jesus S. Duran (upgraded to the Medal of Honor, 2014)
Charles Durning
Graves B. Erskine
Douglas Fairbanks Jr.
Joseph A. Farinholt
Geoffrey Cheney Ferris
Bernard Fisher
Wayne Fisk
Martin H. Foery
Ronald Fogleman
John W. Foss (two awards)
Mayhew Foster
Joseph C. Froshour (two awards) Vietnam
Guy Gabaldon (upgraded to the Navy Cross, 1960)
Francis Gambacorta

James M. Gavin
Hobart R. Gay
Jerauld R. Gentry
John J. Gilligan

Luigi Giorgi (Italian serviceman)
Mathew L. Golsteyn
John W. Goode
Robert J. Graham
David E. Grange Jr. (three awards)
David L. Grange (three awards)
Charles H. Green (Cdr, 3rd Bn, RAR)
John Campbell Greenway
William Guarnere
Ed Guthman
Horatio B. Hackett
David Hackworth (ten awards)
Hugh William Hadley
Alexander Haig
Andrew Haldane (two awards)
Robert Halperin
Iceal Hambleton
Edward Hardin
James C. Harding

John Harllee
Tom Harmon
Raymond Harvey
Carlos Hathcock
Vern Haugland (first civilian award)
Sterling Hayden
Leo D. Hermle (three awards)
Diego E. Hernández
Leigh Ann Hester
Clifford B. Hicks
Thomas Taro Higa

David Lee "Tex" Hill
Tony Hillerman
Lucius Roy Holbrook
Gordon Pai'ea Chung-Hoon
Joe R. Hooper (two awards)
Robert L. Howard
Clifton James
Jean, Grand Duke of Luxembourg
Lyndon B. Johnson
Phil Johnson
Sam Johnson (two awards)
James L. Jones
James Taggart Kerr (two awards)
John Kerry
Jonny Kim
Robert Kingston (two awards)
Joseph Kittinger (two awards)
Charles C. Krulak
Chris Kyle
Henry Louis Larsen (three awards)
Ben Lear 
John C. H. Lee
Kurt Chew-Een Lee

Homer Litzenberg
Elliott Loughlin (two awards)
Douglas MacArthur (seven awards)
Victor Maghakian (two awards)
Fred K. Mahaffey (three awards)
Peyton C. March
Richard Marcinko
George Marshall
Richard Marshall
Barry McCaffrey (two awards)
John McCain
Rob Roy McGregor (three awards)
Herbert Raymond "H.R." McMaster
Sid McMath
John McNulty (two awards)
William A. McNulty
William K. MacNulty 
Merrill A. McPeak
Charles B. McVay III
Richard J. Meadows (two awards)
Ray Melikian (three awards)
Charles L. Melson
Daniel J. Miller
Michael A. Monsoor

Cliff Montgomery
Audie Murphy (two awards)
Michael P. Murphy (upgraded to MOH)
Raymond Murray (four awards)
Bismarck Myrick
Oliver North
Henry Ringling North
Levi Oakes
Mike O'Callaghan
Eric T. Olson
Jorge Otero Barreto (two awards)
Mohamed Oufkir
Moultrie Patten
George S. Patton
George Patton IV
Keith Payne
Endicott Peabody
John J. Pershing
Basil L. Plumley (two awards)

Samuel L. Pollock (two awards)
Pascal Poolaw (four awards)
Nick Popaditch
Charles E. Potter
Geronimo Pratt
Tommy Prince
Francis Gary Powers
Ralph Puckett (two awards)
Chesty Puller
Lewis Burwell Puller Jr.
Agustín Ramos Calero
William Wilson Quinn
Edward F. Rector
Stephen C. Reich
Rick Rescorla
Robert B. Rheault
Karl W. Richter
Matthew Ridgway (two awards)
Antonio Rodríguez Balinas
Pedro Rodriguez (two awards)
Robert Rosenthal
Barney Ross
James N. Rowe

Dick Rutan
Alfredo M. Santos
Paul Saunders
Harold Schrier
Leonard T. Schroeder Jr.
Robert L. Scott
Nate Self
Arthur D. Simons
Rodger W. Simpson
H. Norman Schwarzkopf
Ben Schwartzwalder
Sidney Shachnow
Charles Bradford Smith
Frederick W. Smith
Oliver Prince Smith
Ronald Speirs

Michael G. Stahl (two awards)
Brian Stann
James Stockdale (four awards)
George L. Street III
Samuel D. Sturgis Jr.
Richard K. Sutherland
Thomas Tigue
Richard Tilghman
Pat Tillman
Michel Thomas
Floyd James Thompson
William F. Train II
Matt Urban (two awards)
James Van Fleet (three awards)
Paul K. Van Riper (two awards)
Humbert Roque Versace
Nicolas Walsh (two awards)

John T. Walton
Rawleigh Warner Jr.
Billy Waugh
Jim Webb
Haskell Wexler
Kevin Wheatley
Joshua Wheeler
Charles Willeford
James E. Williams (two awards)
Royce Williams
Jocko Willink
Theodore H. Winters Jr. (three awards)
Jerauld Wright
Tahsin Yazıcı
Chuck Yeager (two awards)
Elton Younger
Douglas A. Zembiec
Leon E. Schoenborn

See also 
 List of Australian Silver Star recipients

References

External links

 Silver Star database at MilitaryTimes.com (Archive.org, not searchable)
 Military Times Hall of Valor (Searchable)
 Awards and Decorations Air Force Personnel Center

Awards established in 1932
Courage awards
Military awards and decorations of the United States
Awards and decorations of the United States Air Force
Awards and decorations of the United States Army
Awards and decorations of the United States Coast Guard
Awards and decorations of the United States Marine Corps
Awards and decorations of the United States Navy
Awards and decorations of the United States Space Force
1932 establishments in the United States